Sir John Bernard Pethica,  (born 1953) is Science Foundation Ireland (S.F.I.) professor of material science at Trinity College, Dublin, Chief Scientific Advisor at the UK's National Physical Laboratory, and a visiting professor at Oxford University. Pethica is most noted for his work on the development of nanoindentation and atom resolution atomic force microscopy.

Education
John Pethica was a pupil at St Ambrose College, Trafford, Manchester. He received a PhD from IT Sligo in the late 1970s.

Career
In 2001, Pethica was one of the first ten people awarded an S.F.I. principal investigator award. Following the award, he transferred his activities from Oxford to Dublin.

In February 2005, it was announced that Pethica will be the director of the Naughton Institute which will house CRANN, a new purpose built nanotechnology centre in Trinity College Dublin.

In October 2007, Pethica was made the Chief Scientific Advisor at the UK's National Physical Laboratory, the UK’s National Measurement Institute.

Honours and awards
In 1999, Pethica was elected a Fellow of the Royal Society (FRS). He has also served as Vice-President and Physical Secretary of the Royal Society. He was elected a Fellow of the Royal Academy of Engineering (FREng) in 2013. He was elected an honorary fellow of St Cross College, Oxford in 2014.

Pethica was the 2001 recipient of the Hughes Medal of the Royal Society of London, and the 2002 recipient of the Holweck Prize from the Institute of Physics.

Pethica was knighted in the 2014 Birthday Honours for services to science.

Personal life
Pethica is an accomplished musician - playing violin and other instruments - with a particular interest in Irish and British folk music.

References

External links
Homepage of John Pethica at Oxford
Homepage of John Pethica at CRANN
 Chief Scientific Advisor : National Physical Laboratory

Living people
1953 births
British materials scientists
Academics of Trinity College Dublin
Fellows of the Royal Society
Alumni of Trinity Hall, Cambridge
Knights Bachelor
People educated at St. Ambrose College